The Liberal Party is a liberal political party in the United Kingdom that was founded in 1989 as a continuation of the original Liberal Party (founded in 1859) by members who opposed its merger with the Social Democratic Party (SDP) to form the Liberal Democrats. The party holds eleven local council seats. The party promotes a hybrid of both classical and social liberal tendencies.

History 
The original Liberal Party entered into an alliance with the Social Democratic Party in 1981 and merged with it in 1988 to form what became the Liberal Democrats. The Liberal Party, founded in 1859, was descended from the Whigs, Radicals, Irish Independent Party and Peelites, while the SDP was a party created in 1981 by former Labour members, MPs and cabinet ministers, but which also gained defections from Conservatives.

A small minority of the Liberal Party, notably including the former Member of Parliament (MP) Michael Meadowcroft (the last elected president of the Liberal Party), resolved to continue with the Liberal Party. They continued using the old party name and symbols, including the party anthem, The Land. Meadowcroft announced this reformation after the defeat of the traditional liberal Alan Beith to become party leader of the Liberal Democrats, although Beith himself stayed with the latter.

The continuing Liberal Party included several councillors and council groups from the pre-1988 party which had never joined the merged party and continued as Liberals (hence the disputed foundation date), but no MPs. Since then, the number of Liberal district councillors has gradually declined. However, as a result of a number of community-based politicians, defections and recruitment the party has an increased number of town and parish councillors. The party has had its greatest success in elections to Liverpool City Council. Its leadership largely comes from the Liverpool area and the party is primarily based in Yorkshire.

Meadowcroft stepped down from the party presidency in 2002, and was replaced by Councillor Steve Radford. In 2007, Meadowcroft left the party and joined the Liberal Democrats. Radford stood down in 2009, and was replaced as president of the party by former councillor Rob Wheway, who served a year as leader. Radford was re-elected party president in 2010, and has been elected for further terms by members in ballot at assemblies and by electronic voting.

Party members take part in Liberal International (LI) activities through the Liberal International British Group.

Europe 
The 1989 reformed party initially continued the Liberal Party's support for European integration but, unlike the Liberal Democrats, they came to oppose the Single European currency and the Maastricht Treaty, the latter of which was seen as disempowering the European Parliament.  In the 1997 general election, they advocated turning the European Union into a "Commonwealth of Europe", which would include all European countries and focus on peace and the environment, rather than on economic issues. In Meadowcroft's book for this election, he advocated joining the Schengen agreement, an idea which did not appear in the party's manifesto.  The Party in this period also opposed referendums with the line "It is dangerous to pretend that issues can be settled by a simple question with a yes or no answer", and instead preferred citizens' juries. After Radford replaced Meadowcroft as party leader, the Liberal Party became increasingly Eurosceptic.

The party put up a full slate of candidates in the North West England region for the 2004 European Parliament election, coming seventh with 4.6% of the vote (0.6% of the total British popular vote).

In the 2009 European Parliament election, the Liberal Party's Steve Radford participated in the No2EU electoral alliance.

In the 2016 United Kingdom European Union membership referendum campaign, the party let candidates express their own views, but both the National Executive and many party members supported Leave. As the party had a long-standing opposition to the use of referendums, they released a statement that ceding sovereignty was an exception to this principle, and that the Lisbon and Maastricht Treaties should have been subjected to referendums on transferring power to the European Union.

Following the referendum, the party argued that the country should leave the EU in its manifestos for the 2017 and 2019 general elections.

Ideology 
The Liberal Party refers to its ideology as a "hybrid" of classical liberalism and social liberalism, and claims that the Liberal Democrats have shown contempt for "liberal principles", the "British people" and the "democratic process".

Electoral performance 

In the 2011 local council elections, eight Liberal councillors held their seats, three lost their seats and five new Liberal councillors were elected: a net gain of two. In the two years to the May 2013 local elections, the number of Liberal councillors rose from 16 to 21.

Cllr Steve Radford received 4,442 (4.5%) of the votes in the first round of the Mayor of Liverpool 2012 election.
In the 2012 United Kingdom local elections there was a net loss of six seats, in the 2013 elections the party won three seats, a gain of one.

Although the Liberal Party has retained councillors in Ryedale and Liverpool, it has not had a significant impact. However, Liberal member John Clark served as chair of Ryedale District Council's policy and resources committee, making him de facto leader of the council, from March 2021 until his death that August. 

In 2014, the Liberal Party held 21 council seats at county and district level and 15 seats at community level. The party has no representation in the UK Parliament or Scottish Parliament, nor did it ever have Members of the European Parliament (MEPs). At the 2001 UK general election the party's best local result was coming second behind Labour in Liverpool West Derby, pushing the Liberal Democrats into third place. However, it was unable to repeat this at the 2005 general election; it finished third behind the Liberal Democrats in the constituency, still beating the Conservative Party, and repeated this position at the 2010 general election. In the 2015 general election the Liberal Party came fourth narrowly holding its deposit, ahead of the Liberal Democrats (who came last) and the Green Party, but behind UKIP and the Conservative Party.

At the 2015 general election, the Liberal Party in Cornwall decided to not contest any seats and urged its supporters to vote for UKIP. At the 2017 general election, the party contested four seats and received 3,672 votes.

In the 2019 general election, the party contested nineteen seats and received 10,562 votes.

At the 2021 local election the party appears not to have won any new seats. A seat was retained on Liverpool City Council. The party lost its last remaining unitary authority seat when Chris Ash of Dogsthorpe Ward of Peterborough City Council retired and no Liberal candidate stood. In the 2021 Mayor of Liverpool election the party's candidate Steve Radford received 7,135 votes (7%).

Elected members 
To date (2022), the Liberal Party has never had any members in the Houses of Parliament, Scottish and Welsh parliaments, the European Parliament or the Northern Ireland and London Assemblies.

County councillors
North Yorkshire (1) representing the Pickering division.

District and unitary councillors 
 Liverpool  (5) three representing the ward of Tuebrook and Stoneycroft, one representing the ward of Croxteth and one representing the ward of Childwall.
 Ryedale (4) representing the wards of Pickering East (2), Pickering West (1) and Cropton (1).
 Test Valley (1) representing the ward of Andover Millway.

Parish councillors 
The party currently (2021) has 15 councillors on parish, town and community councils in North Yorkshire, Devon, Cornwall, Wiltshire, Essex and Wales.

Number of councillors 

Totals include any in-year by-elections and defections, held/gain/loss are the changes since the start of the last municipal year. Figure from the BBC election results before 2003 lists Liberal Party seats amongst "Others" or "Independents".

Controversy 
In May 2021 the party's only candidate at the 2021 Scottish Parliament election, Derek Jackson in the Glasgow Southside constituency, was escorted from the count after arriving wearing rainbow arm-bands, yellow Star of David-style stars, and harassing Humza Yousaf, a candidate in the nearby Pollok constituency. Upon ejection from the count the candidate and his supporters were photographed appearing to give Nazi salutes. The Liberal Party immediately suspended Jackson and issued a statement distancing itself from his comments and actions and apologising for any offence he may have caused; Jackson was expelled from the party on 9 May.

See also 
 Contributions to liberal theory
 Liberal Assembly
 Liberal democracy
 Liberal Democrats
 Liberal Party (1859–1988)
 Liberalism
 Liberalism in the United Kingdom
 Liberalism worldwide
 List of liberal parties
 Social Democratic Party (1988–1990), the rump successor to the SDP which did not merge into the Liberal Democrats
 Social Democratic Party (1990–present), a second rump successor to the SDP which continues to exist
 Whigs
 Whiggism

Notes and references

External links 

 Ryedale Liberals
 unofficial Green Liberals website 
 Catalogue of the Liberal Party 1989 papers at LSE Archives

1989 establishments in the United Kingdom
Centrist political parties in the United Kingdom
Eurosceptic parties in the United Kingdom
Liberal Party (UK) breakaway groups
Liberal parties in the United Kingdom
Political parties established in 1989